E. H. Llewelyn Lloyd (27 July 1792 – 17 February 1876), also published as Lewis Lloyd, was a Welsh amateur naturalist who lived for more than two decades in Sweden.

Lloyd first wrote North of Europe: Comprised in a Personal Narrative of a Residence in Sweden and Norway, in the Years 1827–28 then other diaries and notes. He wrote mainly on Scandinavia's local customs, peasant life, and on nature - particularly ornithology and on the black wolf and wolf hunting.

Works
North of Europe: Comprised in a Personal Narrative of a Residence in Sweden and Norway, in the Years 1827–28.
The Game Birds and Wild Fowl of Sweden and Norway.
Scandinavian Adventures, during a Residence of upwards of Twenty Years.
Peasant Life in Sweden (1870).

References

External links 
 

1876 deaths
1792 births
Welsh expatriates in Sweden